Errin Ewerts (born 25 May 1988) is a South African cricketer. He was a right-handed batsman and a right-arm off-break bowler who played for South Western Districts. He was born in Oudtshoorn.

Ewerts made a single first-class appearance for the side, during the SAA Three-Day Challenge competition of 2006–07, against Boland. He scored 22 runs in the first innings in which he batted, and 3 runs in the second.

Ewerts bowled 5 overs during the match, securing figures of 0-32.

In 2010 Ewerts captained the SWD Academy and represented South African Under 17 team while being a scholar at Oudtshoorn High School.

In 2011 he joined SWD which he had a one-day appearance in Rustenburg, South Africa.

In 2015 he participated in a game against the Northerns and in 2016 became team's captain.

References

External links
Errin Ewerts at Cricket Archive 

1988 births
Living people
South African cricketers
South Western Districts cricketers
People from Oudtshoorn
Cricketers from the Western Cape